Rosalind Sophia Bennett (born 13 May 1963) is an English stage and television actress.

Rosalind was born in Rochdale, Lancashire, and trained at The Drama Centre, she went on to a number of stage, television and screen roles. Her film appearances included Miss Pickwick in American Roulette and Eleanor in Restoration. Television roles included an appearance in six episodes of Coronation Street in 1986. Bennett's stage roles include Mary in Juno and the Paycock at the National Theatre. She appeared as Zoe in the Tales of the Unexpected episode (9/5) "The Facts of Life" (1988).

Personal life
Bennett married actor Linus Roache in 2002. They have no children.

Filmography

Film

Television

References
Notes

Bibliography

External links

1966 births
Actors from Rochdale
Actors from Lancashire
English film actresses
English television actresses
English stage actresses
Living people
20th-century English actresses
21st-century English actresses